Tungsten is a 2011 Greek drama film directed by Giorgos Georgopoulos.

Cast 
 Vangelis Mourikis as Ticket Collector
 Omiros Poulakis as Bus Jumper
 Prometheus Aleifer as Job Candidate 
 Tasos Nousias as Interviewer
 Kora Karvouni as Interviewer's Girlfriend

References

External links 

Greek drama films
2011 drama films
2011 films
Films shot in Athens